Ravernet is a village and townland in County Down, Northern Ireland. It is on the Ravernet River, about 3 km south of Lisburn and about 3 km northeast of Hillsborough. Nearby is Sprucefield and the M1 motorway. In the 2001 Census it had a population of 559.

2001 Census 
Ravernet is classified as a small village or hamlet by the Northern Ireland Statistics and Research Agency (NISRA) (i.e. with population between 500 and 1,000 people).
On Census day (29 April 2001) there were 559 people living in Ravernet. Of these:
28.6% were aged under 16 years and 8.2% were aged 60 and over
50.8% of the population were male and 49.2% were female
4.7% were from a Catholic background and 90.1% were from a Protestant background
2.6% of people aged 16–74 were unemployed

References 

Villages in County Down
Townlands of County Down
Civil parish of Blaris